The Ohio Art Company is an American toy manufacturing company founded in 1908. Based in Bryan, Ohio, the company is principally engaged in two lines of business. The first line of business is the sales, marketing, and distribution of toys. The second line of business is the company's Diversified Products segment which manufactures custom metal lithography products for food container and specialty premium markets. Examples of these are food tins, enclosures, DVD cases, and nostalgic signs.

History
Henry Winzeler started up his own manufacturing company in 1908. He rented an area to work in Archbold, Ohio and named it the Ohio Art Company because of his profound interest in art and its location. Winzeler began making metal picture frames and various other novelty items that were sold in retail stores all over the US. The company moved locations in 1912 to Bryan, Ohio where it became even more successful with its Cupid Awake/Cupid Asleep picture frames. The Ohio Art Company then installed metal lithography equipment. This was used to produce picture frames made out of wood-grained metal sheets.

In 1917, the Ohio Art Company began manufacturing toys such as the windmills and climbing monkey. After World War I, the toy company grew exponentially, leading to the introduction of colorful tea sets and drums. In the late 1950s, a French electrician named André Cassagnes created a drawing toy that used a joystick, glass and aluminum powder. The combination, which he called the "Telecran", gave users the ability to draw a picture and also erase it. After much collaboration with many individuals, the system they developed in the late 1950s is the same one used today. The name of the product was Etch A Sketch.

In the 1950s, a man named W.C Killgallon began working for the Ohio Art Company. The Killgallon family still owns and operates the Ohio Art Company. The final product of the Etch A Sketch was first produced on July 12, 1960 at the Bryan, Ohio factory.  Another toy produced by Ohio Art in the 1960s was the Bizzy Buzz Buzz, invented by Bernard Benson.  Though the Ohio Art Company partook in the toy industry and was very successful, the metal lithography sector of the company remains the core part of its business. It is one of the leading producers of specialty lithographic components.

In 1995, the Etch A Sketch toy was featured in the original Toy Story, in a scene where one performs a "quick draw" duel with Woody. This short 12 second feature was enough to give a significant sales boost, requiring the production line to work overtime to meet demand. By 1999, the company had again fallen into severe financial trouble from canceled orders of various products, reaching a point where the solvency of the company was in question. However, the company recovered with the prudent decision to agree to again have an Etch A Sketch appear in an animated feature film - this time in Toy Story 2. This scene featured an Etch A Sketch being used to present sketches related to the investigation of Woody's kidnapping. At 45 seconds, the scene in question was much longer than the scene in the original movie. The exposure from the highly successful Pixar movie resulted in sales of the toy increasing by 20 percent and ensured the survival of the company.

On February 11, 2016, The Ohio Art Company announced that it has sold its Etch A Sketch and Doodle Sketch brands to Canada-based Spin Master, in a move designed to allow it to focus on its metal lithography business and invest in its manufacturing operations in Bryan. Ohio Art's other toy lines were not included in the sale, however, the company no longer makes toys of any kind.

Awards
Nanoblock won Best Toy of the Year Award at the ASTRA trade show in 2011

References

Sources
 Ohio Art Company website

External links
 Official website

Toy companies of the United States
Manufacturing companies based in Ohio
Companies based in Bryan, Ohio
American companies established in 1908
Design companies established in 1908
Manufacturing companies established in 1908
1908 establishments in Ohio
Companies traded over-the-counter in the United States